Owego Central Historic District is a historic district in Owego in Tioga County, New York.  It encompasses 83 contributing buildings, 1 contributing site, and 1 contributing structure. The district is primarily commercial, with some notable civic and institutional buildings.  Notable buildings include the former Owego Academy (1828), County Clerk's Office, Owego Village Firehouse (1911), Owego National Bank (1913), Presbyterian Church, and the Greek Revival and Italianate style Riverow commercial complex.
It was listed on the National Register of Historic Places in 1980 and its boundaries were increased in 1998.

The district includes Tioga County Courthouse and U.S. Post Office (Owego, New York), which are separately listed on the National Register.

References

External links

Historic districts on the National Register of Historic Places in New York (state)
Federal architecture in New York (state)
Beaux-Arts architecture in New York (state)
Italianate architecture in New York (state)
Historic districts in Tioga County, New York
National Register of Historic Places in Tioga County, New York